Phi Kappa Sigma is an international all-male college secret society and social fraternity. The most common nicknames for the fraternity are Skulls, Skullhouse, Phi Kap, and PKS with the first two deriving from the skull and crossbones on the fraternity's badge and coat of arms). 

Phi Kappa Sigma was founded by Dr. Samuel Brown Wylie Mitchell at the University of Pennsylvania, an Ivy League university based in Philadelphia. Mitchell recorded the initial ideas and concepts of Phi Kappa Sigma on August 16, 1850. He then began to discuss the idea with other students, first Charles Hare Hutchinson, and then Alfred Victor du Pont (son of Alfred V. du Pont), John Thorne Stone, Andrew Adams Ripka, James Bayard Hodge, and Duane Williams. The seven men formally founded the fraternity on October 19, 1850 becoming the founding fathers of Phi Kappa Sigma 

Phi Kappa Sigma is a charter member of the North American Interfraternity Conference, and since 2017, is headquartered in Carmel, Indiana.  Prior to relocating its headquarters to Carmel, Indiana the fraternity was based in Philadelphia, Valley Forge, and Chester Springs.

Badge
The fraternity's badge was designed by its founder, Dr. Samuel Brown Wylie Mitchell.  Outside of changes in size, its official design has remained the same. In the shape of a cross pattée, the badge is old gold with black decoration. The center of the cross is anchored by a skull and crossbones. The four leaves of the cross display, individually, the Greek letters Phi, Kappa, and Sigma, starting at the left leaf and rotating counter-clockwise. The fourth and top leaf display a six-pointed star. The back of the badge has an engraved serpent echoing the serpent from the fraternity's coat of arms.

Chapter listing
See List of Phi Kappa Sigma chapters

Notable members
 Skip Bayless, ESPN anchor and journalist
 Jorge Andres, sports anchor
 Dalton Bales, Canadian politician
 Derek Bok, 25th President of Harvard University and 7th Dean of Harvard Law School
 J.M.S. Careless, Canadian historian
 Roger B. Chaffee, Navy pilot; NASA astronaut; killed during Apollo 1 training exercise
 James A. Champy, member of MIT Corporation board of trustees and Analog Devices, Inc board of directors
 Dan Chaon, author
 Denny Crum, head basketball coach, University of Louisville (NCAA Champions, 1980 and 1986)
 John Curley, first editor of USA Today; former head of Gannett News
 Frederick de Cordova, producer of The Tonight Show Starring Johnny Carson; producer and director of the Jack Benny Show and My Three Sons
 Alexis F. du Pont, Director of DuPont de Nemours (currently DuPont)
 Pierre S. du Pont, Director of DuPont de Nemours (currently DuPont); former CEO of General Motors
 Stanley Hiller, helicopter pioneer; one of the world's three principal developers of vertical flight
 George David Low, NASA astronaut; Orbital Sciences Corporation executive
 Dan Leal, pornographic film star and director Paul Lynde, comedian and actor; appeared on the game show Hollywood Squares as the "center square;" played Uncle Arthur on Bewitched John A. McCone, CIA Director during Cold War
 Frank McGuire, head basketball coach at the University of South Carolina
 Stanford Moore, Nobel Prize Winning Chemist
 Scott A. Muller, Olympian (1996)
 David Nolan, founder of the US Libertarian Party; inventor of the Nolan chart
 Lewis F. Powell Jr., former Supreme Court Justice
 Edward Mills Purcell, winner of the Nobel Prize for Physics
 Bob Riley, politician; former Governor of Alabama
 James G. Roche, 20th Secretary of the Air Force
 Craig Sams, founder, Green & Black’s chocolate
 Cyrus Wadia, Senior Policy Analyst, White House Office of Science and Technology Policy; winner of Technology Reviews "top innovators under 35" award in 2009
 Tom Wolfe, author of The Bonfire of the Vanities''
 Steven Zierk, 2010 World Under 18 Chess Champion

See also
List of social fraternities and sororities

References

External links
 Home page of Phi Kappa Sigma

 
International student societies
North American Interfraternity Conference
Student organizations established in 1850
1850 establishments in Pennsylvania